Abrams may refer to:


People
 Abrams (surname), a list of notable people with the surname

Places

United States
 Abrams, Wisconsin, a town
 Abrams (community), Wisconsin, an unincorporated community
 Abrams Mountain, Colorado
 Abrams Creek (Tennessee)
 Abrams Creek (Virginia)
 Abrams Run, West Virginia, a stream

Elsewhere
 Mount Abrams, Graham Land, Antarctica

Other uses
 M1 Abrams, the main battle tank of the United States Army
 Abrams v. United States, 250 U.S. 616 (1919), a U.S. Supreme Court decision regarding free speech during times of war
 Abrams Air Craft Corporation, an American aircraft manufacturer
 Abrams Books, U.S. publishing house
 Abrams Discoveries, a non-fiction book series published by Harry N. Abrams
 The Abrams, a Canadian country music band

See also
 Abrams Planetarium, the planetarium on the campus of Michigan State University
 Abram (disambiguation)
 Abramson (surname)
 Abrahams (surname)